Alan Gilbert may refer to:
 Alan Gilbert (conductor) (born 1967), American conductor and violinist
 Alan Gilbert (Australian academic) (1944–2010), Australian historian and academic administrator
 Alan Gilbert (American academic), American professor
 Charles Allan Gilbert (1873–1929),  American illustrator

See also